Robert Douglas Friend (born 23 January 1981) is a Canadian former professional soccer player, who played as a forward, and CEO of Pacific FC.

Early life and education 
Friend was born 23 January 1981 in Rosetown, Saskatchewan, Canada, and grew up in Kelowna, British Columbia. He was the first Kelowna-based player to make the British Columbia Provincial team, a collection of top youth players, and was named captain of the 1997 team. Friend was exposed to senior level play early, appearing for Okanagan Challenge of the Premier Development Soccer League as well as appearing in an exhibition for the Vancouver 86ers of the A-League.

Despite training with English club Crewe Alexandra F.C., Friend decided to attend Western Michigan University instead of turning pro. He played college soccer for the Western Michigan Broncos from 1999 to 2000, appearing in 40 games and scoring 9 goals.

Friend transferred to the University of California, Santa Barbara and finished his collegiate career with the UC Santa Barbara Gauchos men's soccer team. As a senior, Friend scored in 12 consecutive matches which ranks fifth in NCAA Division I history. He appeared in 40 games for the Gauchos, scoring 31 goals and assisting on 9 more. He was named as a 2002 All-American, becoming the first Gaucho in 32 years to receive the honor.

Club career

Norway 
After graduation from UCSB, Friend went on trial with Moss FK in December 2002. After a positive showing, he signed a two-year deal in December 2002 for Moss FK's upcoming 2003 Norwegian First Division season. Despite his contract with Moss FK, Friend was drafted in the 4th Round (35th Overall) of the 2003 MLS SuperDraft by Chicago Fire making him the first player from UCSB drafted to MLS.

Friend made 41 league appearances and scored 16 league goals for Moss FK over his two-season span with the club before being transferred to Molde FK in August 2004. With Molde, he won the 2005 Norwegian Football Cup and scored a goal in the Final. He remained with the Molde FK until 2006, making 40 league appearances and scoring 14 league goals for the club.

The Netherlands 
Early 2006 saw interest in Friend rise with Crystal Palace F.C. and Vålerenga Fotball among teams looking to purchase him. It was announced in late March 2006 that Friend was sold to SC Heerenveen ahead of the 2006–07 Eredivisie season. Per terms of the agreement, his last game for Molde FK was in July and a portion of the transfer fee went to his original club Moss FK.

After making 19 appearances with Heerenveen and scoring five goals, he was loaned to Heracles Almelo in January 2007 to conclude the 2006–07 Eredivisie season. Despite his contributions, Heerenveen deemed him surplus to requirements and transferred him on to Borussia Mönchengladbach.

Germany 
During the 2007–08 season Friend scored 18 goals in 33 matches, making him Borussia Mönchengladbach's top scorer and the second top scorer in Bundesliga 2. His team finished first, and were promoted to the Bundesliga.

On 17 August 2008, Friend scored in his very first game in the Bundesliga, against VfB Stuttgart. After three years in Mönchengladbach, including two in the Bundesliga, Friend was sold from the club and was bought by the newly relegated Hertha BSC for €1.8 million.

Friend made his debut and scored his first goal for Berlin on 14 August 2010 in a DFB-Pokal cup match versus Pfullendorf, the game ended as a 2–0 victory. Six days later he made his league debut for the team in a 3–2 victory over Rot-Weiß Oberhausen. On 12 September, Friend had a man of the match performance scoring 2 goals in a 3–1 home victory over Arminia Bielefeld at Olympic Stadium. Friend finished his first season with Hertha having scored 6 goals in 27 appearances in the 2. Bundesliga and DFB-Pokal. He helped Hertha win the 2. Bundesliga gaining automatic promotion back to top flight football. On the final day of the 2011 summer transfer window, Friend returned to the second division, joining the newly relegated Eintracht Frankfurt. He was close to re-joining Major League Soccer in the United States in January 2013, but despite interest from Vancouver Whitecaps FC Friend saw his contract to completion in Germany.

United States 
On 13 January 2014, Friend made the move to Major League Soccer club Los Angeles Galaxy. After one season with Los Angeles, which included winning the 2014 MLS Cup, Friend announced his retirement on 10 December 2014 due to issues stemming from concussions.

International career 

Friend has represented Canada at the U-20, U-23, and senior levels. He saw action in the 2001 FIFA World Youth Championship, as well as the 2004 CONCACAF Men Pre-Olympic Tournament.

Friend made his debut with the senior international team on 18 January 2003 in a friendly with the United States. Since then, and as of February 2013, he has been capped 32 times by his country, scoring twice. He has represented Canada in five FIFA World Cup qualification matches.

Personal life 
Friend was inducted into the UCSB Intercollegiate Athletics Hall of Fame in 2008. In August 2014, Friend was named as the inaugural sports ambassador for the Academy for Canadians in Sports and Entertainment – Los Angeles.

Friend is married to Marisa Lauren "Mari" Bell, a former UC Santa Barbara women's volleyball player. The couple have three children.

Pop culture
Friend was featured in the book Saskatchewan Soccer People: Martin Nash, Rob Friend, Kevin Holness, Jordan Schidlowsky, Brian Philley, Norman Sheldon, Amy Vermeulen.

Career statistics

Club

International 

Scores and results list Canada's goal tally first, score column indicates score after each Friend goal.

References

External links 

 

 
 UC Santa Barbara player profile

1981 births
Living people
People from Rosetown
Association football forwards
Soccer people from British Columbia
Soccer people from Saskatchewan
Sportspeople from Kelowna
Canadian soccer players
Canada men's international soccer players
2007 CONCACAF Gold Cup players
2011 CONCACAF Gold Cup players
Canadian expatriate soccer players
Canadian expatriates in the United States
Canadian expatriate sportspeople in Norway
Canadian expatriate sportspeople in the Netherlands
Canadian expatriate sportspeople in Germany
UC Santa Barbara Gauchos men's soccer players
Moss FK players
Molde FK players
SC Heerenveen players
Heracles Almelo players
Borussia Mönchengladbach players
Hertha BSC players
Chicago Fire FC draft picks
Eintracht Frankfurt players
Eintracht Frankfurt II players
TSV 1860 Munich players
LA Galaxy players
Eliteserien players
Norwegian First Division players
Eredivisie players
Bundesliga players
2. Bundesliga players
Major League Soccer players
Expatriate soccer players in the United States
Expatriate footballers in Norway
Expatriate footballers in the Netherlands
Expatriate footballers in Germany
Pacific FC non-playing staff
Canada men's youth international soccer players
Canada men's under-23 international soccer players
Vancouver FC non-playing staff